Economic liberalization (or economic liberalisation) is the lessening of government regulations and restrictions in an economy in exchange for greater participation by private entities. In politics, the doctrine is associated with classical liberalism and neoliberalism. Liberalization in short is "the removal of controls" to encourage economic development.

Many countries have pursued and followed the path of economic liberalization in the 1980s, 1990s and in the 21st century, with the stated goal of maintaining or increasing their competitiveness as business environments. Liberalization policies may or often include the partial or complete privatization of government institutions and state-owned assets, greater labour market flexibility, lower tax rates for businesses, less restrictions on both domestic and foreign capital, open markets, etc. In support of liberalization, former British prime minister Tony Blair wrote that: "Success will go to those companies and countries which are swift to adapt, slow to complain, open and willing to change. The task of modern governments is to ensure that our countries can rise to this challenge."

In developing countries, economic liberalization refers more to liberalization or further "opening up" of their respective economies to foreign capital and investments. Three of the fastest growing developing economies today; Brazil, China, and India, have achieved rapid economic growth in the past several years or decades, in part, from having "liberalized" their economies to foreign capital. 

Many countries nowadays, particularly those in the third world, arguably were given no choice but to "liberalize" their economies (privatise key industries to foreign ownership) to remain competitive in attracting and retaining both their domestic and foreign investments. This is referred to as the TINA factor, standing for "there is no alternative". For example, in China after Cultural Revolution, reforms were introduced and in 1991, India had little choice but to implement economic reforms. Similarly, in the Philippines, the contentious proposals for Charter Change include amending the economically restrictive provisions of their 1987 constitution.

By this measure, an opposite of a liberalized economy are economies such as North Korea's economy with their "self-sufficient" economic system that is closed to foreign trade and investment (see autarky). However, North Korea is not completely separate from the global economy, since it actively trades with China, through Dandong, a large border port and receives aid from other countries in exchange for peace and restrictions in their nuclear programme. Another example would be oil-rich countries such as Saudi Arabia and the United Arab Emirates, which see no need to further open up their economies to foreign capital and investments since their oil reserves already provide them with huge export earnings.

The adoption of economic reforms in the first place and then its reversal or sustenance is a function of certain factors, the presence or absence of which will determine the outcome. Sharma (2011) explains all such factors and puts forward a discursive dominance theory to illustrate the causal mechanism. The theory holds that economic reforms become sustainable when the discursive conditions prevailing in society tip against the existing paradigm under exceptional circumstances. Using the case of India, he demonstrates that economic reforms became sustainable after 1991 because of the discursive dominance of the pro-liberalization discourse after 1991. He shows that the eight factors, which are responsible for creating discursive conditions in the favour of economic reforms, prevailed in India in the post 1991 operating environment. The eight factors are: the dominant view of international intellectuals, illustrative country cases, executive orientation, political will, the degree and the perceived causes of economic crisis, attitudes on the part of donor agencies, and the perceived outcomes of economic reforms. In other words, the Discursive Dominance Theory of Economic Reform Sustainability holds that unless the pro-liberalization constituencies dominate the development discourse, economic reforms, initiated under the exigencies of crisis and conditionalities, or carried out by a convinced executive with or without the stimulus of a crisis, will be reversed. The author's theory is fairly generalizable and is applicable to the developing countries which have implemented economic reforms in the 1990s, e.g. Russia in the Yeltsin era.

Liberalization of services in the developing world

Potential benefits
The service sector is probably the most liberalized of the sectors. Liberalization offers the opportunity for the sector to compete internationally, contributing to GDP growth and generating foreign exchange. As such, service exports are an important part of many developing countries' growth strategies. India's IT services have become globally competitive as many companies have outsourced certain administrative functions to countries where costs (esp. wages) are lower. Furthermore, if service providers in some developing economies are not competitive enough to succeed on world markets, overseas companies will be attracted to invest, bringing with them international "best practices" and better skills and technologies. The entry of foreign service providers can be a positive as well as negative development. For example, it can lead to better services for domestic consumers, improve the performance and competitiveness of domestic service providers, as well as simply attract FDI/foreign capital into the country. In fact, some research suggest a 50% cut in service trade barriers over a five- to ten-year period would create global gains in economic welfare of around $250 billion per annum.

Potential risks of trade liberalization
Trade liberalisation carries substantial risks that necessitate careful economic management through appropriate regulation by governments. Some argue foreign providers crowd out domestic providers and instead of leading to investment and the transfer of skills, it allows foreign providers and shareholders "to capture the profits for themselves, taking the money out of the country". Thus, it is often argued that protection is needed to allow domestic companies the chance to develop before they are exposed to international competition. This is also supported by the anthropologist Trouillot who argues that the current market system is not a free market at all, but instead a privatized market (IE, markets can be 'bought'). Other potential risks resulting from liberalisation, include:

 Risks of financial sector instability resulting from global contagion
 Risk of brain drain
 Risk of environmental degradation
 Risk of a debt spiral due to decreased tax revenue among other economic problems (oftentimes linked to IMF restructuring though the state government in Kansas is currently encountering this issue).
 Risk of increased inequality across race, ethnicity, or gender lines. For example, according to the anthropologist Lilu Abu-Lughod we see increased gender inequality in new markets as women lose labor opportunities that existed prior to market liberalization.

However, researchers at thinks tanks such as the Overseas Development Institute argue the risks are outweighed by the benefits and that what is needed is careful regulation. For instance, there is a risk that private providers will 'skim off' the most profitable clients and cease to serve certain unprofitable groups of consumers or geographical areas. Yet such concerns could be addressed through regulation and by a universal service obligations in contracts, or in the licensing, to prevent such a situation from occurring. Of course, this bears the risk that this barrier to entry will dissuade international competitors from entering the market (see Deregulation). Examples of such an approach include South Africa's Financial Sector Charter or Indian nurses who promoted the nursing profession within India itself, which has resulted in a rapid growth in demand for nursing education and a related supply response.

Examples
 Economic liberalization by region
Economic liberalisation in India
Economic liberalisation in Myanmar
Economic liberalisation in Pakistan
Effects of Economic Liberalisation on Education in Tajikistan
Baltic Tiger (Estonia, Latvia, Lithuania, c. 2000–present)
Economy of Cuba, starting in 1994 and accelerating under Raúl Castro
Indonesian economic boom, Starting after the Secession of East Timor in 1999 with the beginnings of the 21st Century.

Historical examples
 Economic liberalization in the post–World War II era
 Chinese economic reform
 Perestroika (Soviet Union)
 Economic history of Brazil in the 1980s and 1990s
 Miracle of Chile
 Đổi Mới (Vietnam)

See also
Multilateral development bank
 International Monetary Fund (IMF)
World Bank (WB)
Asian Development Bank (ADB)
New Development Bank
 Capitalism
 Economic liberalism
 Free market
 Globalization
 Liberalization
 Neoliberalism
 Privatization

References

 
Economic reforms